Bernhard Stübecke (6 May 1904 – 2 August 1964) was a German cyclist. He competed in the individual road race at the 1928 Summer Olympics.

References

External links
 

1904 births
1964 deaths
German male cyclists
Olympic cyclists of Germany
Cyclists at the 1928 Summer Olympics
Cyclists from North Rhine-Westphalia
People from Märkischer Kreis
Sportspeople from Arnsberg (region)
20th-century German people